Line 9 of the Changchun Rail Transit is a rapid transit line running from Zhaojiagang East to North Zhongchuan Street including a stop called Changchun Longjia Airport Station. It is under construction and planned to open in 2025.

History

Phase 1 
Plans to open by 2025 from Zhaojiagang East to Jiutai South Railway Station including Changchun Longjia Airport Station.

References

Changchun Rail Transit lines